The Shahpurkandi Dam project is located on the Ravi River in Pathankot district, Punjab, India, downstream from the existing Ranjit Sagar Dam. The power houses will be constructed on Hydel Channel, which is downstream from Shahpurkandi Dam. The water released by Ranjit Sagar Dam is to be utilised for generating power for this project. The project will generate electricity of up to 206MW and provide irrigation to Punjab (5,000 Ha) and Jammu and Kashmir (32,173 Ha). The construction of the dam is as per the framework of the Indus Water Treaty regarding sharing of rivers between India and Pakistan.

The project comprises seven hydro-generating sets located in two power houses 6 nos. each of 33 MW and one of 8 MW. The gross storage of the balancing reservoir is 4.23 tmcft. The water released from the upstream Ranjit Sagar Dam, after generating electricity through the 600 MW power house during peak hours, is stored in the balancing reservoir to supply water to the irrigation canals continuously without any overflow into the downstream river.

As per the decision of the government of Punjab, civil works of this project are to be executed by Punjab Water Resources Department, except Electro & Mechanical (E&M) works of the project, which are to be carried out by the PSPCL. Notification of Award for Electro-Mechanical (E&M) works of 206 MW Shahpurkandi Hydro Electric Project (HEP) on an EPC-mode basis to M/S BHEL, New Delhi, was issued on 29 January 2014. The contract agreement was signed on 28 February 2014. A Turbine Model Test witness test was carried out from 18 to 27 September 2014 at Hydro Lab, BHEL, Bhopal.

References

Dams in Punjab, India
Dams under construction
Hydroelectric power stations in Punjab, India
Gravity dams
Pathankot district
Run-of-the-river power stations